Bębnikąt may refer to the following places:
Bębnikąt, Greater Poland Voivodeship (west-central Poland)
Bębnikąt, Kołobrzeg County in West Pomeranian Voivodeship (north-west Poland)
Bębnikąt, Stargard County in West Pomeranian Voivodeship (north-west Poland)